Below a list of Scheduled Caste communities and their population according to the 2001 Census of India in the state of Gujarat.

List 
Regar Rajasthani

References 

Social groups of Gujarat
Gujarat